Krishnan Shrijith (born 12 August 1996) is an Indian cricketer. He made his Twenty20 debut on 10 January 2021, for Karnataka in the 2020–21 Syed Mushtaq Ali Trophy.

References

External links
 

1996 births
Living people
Indian cricketers
Karnataka cricketers
Place of birth missing (living people)